Granite Falls Municipal Airport , also known as Lenzen-Roe Memorial Field, is a public-use airport in Yellow Medicine County, Minnesota, United States. It is owned by the City of Granite Falls and located four nautical miles (7 km) south of its central business district. The airport is situated near State Highway 23.

Although most U.S. airports use the same three-letter location identifier for the FAA and IATA, this airport is assigned GDB by the FAA but has no designation from the IATA

Facilities and aircraft 
It has one runway designated 15/33 with an asphalt surface measuring 4,350 by 75 feet (1,326 x 23 m).

For the 12-month period ending August 31, 2006, the airport had 7,000 general aviation aircraft operations, an average of 19 per day. At that time there were 15 aircraft based at this airport: 11 single-engine, 2 multi-engine and 2 jet.

References

External links 
 Airport page at City of Granite Falls website
 

Airports in Minnesota
Buildings and structures in Yellow Medicine County, Minnesota
Transportation in Yellow Medicine County, Minnesota